NGC 862 is an elliptical galaxy located in the constellation of Phoenix about 241 million light years from the Milky Way. It was discovered by the British astronomer John Herschel in 1834.

See also 
 List of NGC objects (1–1000)

References 

Elliptical galaxies
0862
Phoenix (constellation)
008487